Vladimir Andreyevich Markov (May 8, 1871 – January 18, 1897) was a Russian mathematician, known for proving the Markov brothers' inequality with his older brother Andrey Markov. He died of tuberculosis at the age of 25.

Notes

External links 
 Photograph (History of Approximation Theory pages)
 

Russian mathematicians
19th-century mathematicians from the Russian Empire
1871 births
1897 deaths
19th-century deaths from tuberculosis
Tuberculosis deaths in Russia